Barsali railway station is a railway station in Betul district, Madhya Pradesh. Its code is BYS. It serves the village of Barsali. The station consists of two platforms.

References

Railway stations in Betul district
Nagpur CR railway division
Railway junction stations in Madhya Pradesh